College Street Presbyterian Church, also known as Louisville Bible Church, is a historic church at 113 W. College Street in Louisville, Kentucky. It was built in 1867 and added to the National Register in 1978.

It was designed by architect John Shirewalt (1811-1871), who studied under New York architects Ithiel Town and Alexander Jackson Davis.

The church may no longer exist.

References

Presbyterian churches in Kentucky
Churches on the National Register of Historic Places in Kentucky
Churches completed in 1867
19th-century Presbyterian church buildings in the United States
Churches in Louisville, Kentucky
National Register of Historic Places in Louisville, Kentucky
1867 establishments in Kentucky